McGown may refer to:

People
 Carl McGown, volleyball coach
 Claudia McGown, murder victim in the Fischer Projects of New Orleans 
 Doris Elizabeth McGown, better known as Doris Angleton, Texas socialite and murder victim
 Edward McGown, British director of the movie Bachelor Games
 Eva McGown (1883–1972), Official Hostess of Fairbanks, Alaska
 Jill McGown (1947–2007), British mystery writer
 Ken McGown (1936–2010), Australian rules footballer
 Lea McGown, motel manager and witness in the Oklahoma City bombing
 Pearl McGown (1891–1983), American hooked rug designer and teacher, known for establishing the McGown Teacher Workshop
 Rhoderick McGown (born 1972), Zimbabwean swimmer
 Richard McGown (born 1937), Scottish-Zimbabwean former anaesthetist, murderer, and suspected serial killer
 Rima Berns-McGown, Canadian politician
 Stephen Malcolm McGown, South African victim in the 2011 Timbuktu kidnapping
 Tom McGown (1876–1956), Irish international rugby player

Fictional people 
 Jay McGown, a character in the 1961 novel The Gay Place

Places
 McGown Lakes, a group of lakes in Custer County, Idaho
 McGown Peak, a peak in the Sawtooth Range of Idaho
 McGown's Pass Tavern, a 19th-century tavern in New York's Central Park

See also
 McGowan
 McCown
 Gown (disambiguation)